Kadobe no Iwatari (門部石足) was a Japanese waka poet in the Nara period.

Biography 
Little is known of the life of Kadobe no Iwatari. His kabane was Muraji. In Tenpyō 1 (729) he was working as an official in Chikuzen. The following year he participated in a plum blossom-viewing party at the residence of Ōtomo no Tabito, then the governor (一大宰帥 ichi Dazai no sochi) of Dazaifu.

Poetry 
Poems 568 and 845 in the Man'yōshū are attributed to him.

See also 
 Reiwa

References

Citations

Works cited 

 
 

8th-century Japanese poets
Man'yō poets
Japanese male poets